Tomáš Hrnka (born November 11, 1991) is a Slovak professional ice hockey player who currently plays with HK Nitra of the Slovak Extraliga. He also represents the Slovak national team.

He participated at the 2017 IIHF World Championship.

Career statistics

Regular season and playoffs

International

References

External links

1991 births
Living people
Slovak ice hockey forwards
Sportspeople from Nitra
HC Košice players
HC Plzeň players
HC Slovan Bratislava players
HC '05 Banská Bystrica players
HK Nitra players
Slovak expatriate ice hockey players in the Czech Republic